Reshard or ReShard is a given name. Notable people with the given name include:

Reshard Cliett (born 1992), American football player
Reshard Langford (born 1986), American football player
ReShard Lee (born 1980), American football player

See also
Rashard

Masculine given names